The Plaza Hotel is a historic hotel in Jacksonville, Florida. On December 30, 1992, it was added to the U.S. National Register of Historic Places.

References

External links
 Duval County listings at National Register of Historic Places
 Florida's Office of Cultural and Historical Programs
 Duval County listings
 Plaza Hotel

Buildings and structures in Jacksonville, Florida
History of Jacksonville, Florida
National Register of Historic Places in Jacksonville, Florida
Hotels in Florida
Vernacular architecture in Florida